Taissa Farmiga (born August 17, 1994) is an American actress. Born in Whitehouse Station, New Jersey, she is the younger sister of actress Vera Farmiga. Her numerous appearances in horror films have established her as a scream queen. 

Farmiga was encouraged to begin acting by her sister, and subsequently made her debut in her sister's film Higher Ground (2011). Thereafter, she rose to prominence for her work on the anthology series American Horror Story, starring in the seasons Murder House (2011), Coven (2013–2014), Roanoke (2016) and Apocalypse (2018). Her early film roles include the romantic comedy At Middleton (2013), the crime drama The Bling Ring (2013) and the psychological thriller Mindscape (2013), the latter of which was her first starring film role.

Farmiga was lauded for her performances in the comedy slasher film The Final Girls (2015), and the drama films 6 Years (2015) and Share (2015), all of which premiered at South by Southwest, which led her to be named one of the breakout stars of the festival. She has also provided the voice of Raven in the DC Animated Movie Universe (2016–2020), starred in the comedy films Rules Don't Apply (2016) and The Long Dumb Road (2018), the drama films In a Valley of Violence (2016) and What They Had (2018) and the supernatural thriller film The Nun (2018). Farmiga headlined the procedural drama series Wicked City (2015), and made her stage debut in the off-Broadway revival of the drama play Buried Child (2016).

Early life
Farmiga was born in Whitehouse Station, New Jersey, on August 17, 1994, the daughter of Ukrainian immigrants Lubomyra Spas, a schoolteacher, and Michael Farmiga, a systems analyst. She has six older siblings named Victor, Vera, Stephan, Nadia, Alexander, and Laryssa, the last of whom was born with spina bifida. Her maternal grandparents met at Karlsfeld, a sub-camp of the Dachau concentration camp system, during World War II. Farmiga attended public school until fourth grade, after which she began homeschooling. She has stated that she understands the Ukrainian language but can only partially speak it. She is proficient in American Sign Language, having taken classes for four years. Farmiga was raised Pentecostal as her sister Vera and the rest of the family had already been converts from the Ukrainian Greek Catholic Church.

Career

2011–2014: Early work and television breakthrough 
Although Farmiga initially planned to become an accountant, she was persuaded by her sister, Vera Farmiga, to appear in her directorial debut drama Higher Ground, where she was cast as the 16-year-old version of the lead character Corinne Walker. Shortly after its premiere at the 2011 Sundance, where Farmiga garnered rave reviews for her performance, she was signed to talent agency ICM Partners.

That same year, Farmiga starred in the first season of FX's anthology series American Horror Story, which launched her to worldwide prominence. Murder House, where she played Violet Harmon, the troubled adolescent daughter of Vivien (Connie Britton) and Ben Harmon (Dylan McDermott). She secured the role of Violet Harmon in her first professional acting audition. She next joined the cast of Sofia Coppola's crime satire The Bling Ring, based on the real life group of the same name, portraying 17-year-old wild child Sam Moore. The film opened in Un Certain Regard at the 2013 Cannes Film Festival to generally positive reviews. She portrayed Audrey Martin, an uptight teen touring a college campus, in the romantic comedy At Middleton, co-starring with her sister Vera and Andy García. The film premiered at the 2013 Seattle International Film Festival and received a mixed to positive response from critics.

Farmiga starred as Zoe Benson, a young witch afflicted with a dark and dangerous power in American Horror Story: Coven (20132014), for which she received critical acclaim. She had her first leading film role as Anna Greene in Jorge Dorado's psychological thriller Mindscape, which premiered at the 2013 Sitges Film Festival. Her performance in Mindscape was lauded by critics; Fotogramas, Spain's oldest film magazine, described her as "hypnotizing", comparing her to a young Hannibal Lecter, and La Razón called her "the hypnotic Farmiga, the precocious youngster with ambiguous and intelligent class". She next co-starred as Sarah, the main character's love interest, in the biographical crime drama Jamesy Boy (2014).

2015–2016: Rise to prominence in mainstream film 

Farmiga starred in three films that premiered at the 2015 South by Southwest: the first was Todd Strauss-Schulson's critically-acclaimed horror comedy The Final Girls, in which she portrayed the lead role of final girl Max Cartwright, which earned her a Fright Meter Award nomination. The second was Hannah Fidell's heavily improvised romantic drama 6 Years, in which she starred as Melanie Clark. The third and final film was Pippa Bianco's short drama Share, in which she played Krystal Williams, a teenager who returns to school after an explicit video of her sexual assault goes viral. Her performances in all these films were lauded, and Farmiga was listed as one of the breakout stars of the festival.

Farmiga next appeared as Karen McClaren, a young journalist who gets caught up in the hunt for a serial killer, in ABC's short-lived crime drama series Wicked City (2015). On filming the series, she stated that "There's neon lights and billboards and clubs, and it just feels so fun – even though there's a seedy underbelly to it." The series received mixed reviews from critics, and due to low ratings was cancelled after three episodes, with the remaining unaired episodes later debuting on Hulu.

In 2016, she made her stage debut as Shelly in the Off-Broadway revival of Sam Shepard's drama Buried Child, also starring Ed Harris and Amy Madigan. She then starred opposite Ethan Hawke and John Travolta in the Ti West-directed revenge Western film In a Valley of Violence, playing a motormouthed young innkeeper who befriends Hawke's character. The film premiered at the 2016 South by Southwest, and was met with positive reviews. Farmiga made her voice acting debut as the superhero Raven in DC Comics' Justice League vs. Teen Titans, directed by Sam Liu, which premiered at the 2016 WonderCon, and thereafter returned to American Horror Story for the sixth season of the series, Roanoke, where she guest starred as Sophie Green in the November 2016 episode "Chapter 9". Farmiga next co-starred as Sarah Bransford in Warren Beatty's ensemble romantic comedy-drama Rules Don't Apply, which premiered at the 2016 AFI Fest to mixed reviews. The project reunited Farmiga with her Buried Child co-stars Harris and Madigan, who portray her character's parents in the film.

2017–present: Established actress and current work 
Farmiga reprised her voice role as Raven in Teen Titans: The Judas Contract, again directed by Sam Liu, which premiered at the 2017 WonderCon. She next played Emma Ertz in Elizabeth Chomko's drama film What They Had, and re-teamed with director Hannah Fidell for the comedy film The Long Dumb Road, both of which premiered at the 2018 Sundance. Farmiga next appeared as the Catholic novitiate Sister Irene in Corin Hardy's horror film The Nun, the fifth film in The Conjuring Universe, which was released in September 2018, and emerged as the highest-grossing film in its series.

In August 2018, it was confirmed that Farmiga would return to American Horror Story for the eighth season of the series, American Horror Story: Apocalypse, portraying both her Murder House and Coven characters, Violet Harmon and Zoe Benson. Farmiga then played protagonist Merricat Blackwood in Stacie Passon's film adaptation of Shirley Jackson's mystery novel We Have Always Lived in the Castle, which premiered at the 2018 LA Film Festival. She also appeared alongside Clint Eastwood and Bradley Cooper in the Eastwood-directed drama film The Mule, released in December 2018.

In May 2019, Farmiga appeared as Annie Miller in an episode of the CBS All Access series of The Twilight Zone, a reboot of the 1959 TV series of the same name, where she starred opposite Rhea Seehorn, Luke Kirby and Ike Barinholtz. That same year, Farmiga was cast in the HBO period drama series The Gilded Age as socialite Gladys Russell.

Personal life
Farmiga owns a home in Los Feliz, Los Angeles. In May 2019, she was reported to be engaged to screenwriter and director Hadley Klein. They were married in an intimate ceremony at their home on August 8, 2020.

Filmography

Film

Television

Stage

Accolades

Awards and nominations

Honors 

 Farmiga was included on Variety magazine's list of "The 14 Women Who Dominated the South by Southwest Film Festival" for her works in The Final Girls (2015) and 6 Years (2015).

References

External links

 
 
 
 

1994 births
21st-century American actresses
Actresses from New Jersey
American child actresses
American film actresses
American people of Ukrainian descent
American stage actresses
American television actresses
American voice actresses
Living people
People from Readington Township, New Jersey
People from Los Feliz, Los Angeles